FlashPaper (originally known as Flash Printer) was a software application developed by Blue Pacific Software before its acquisition by Macromedia, which was later acquired by Adobe Systems. Its functional design mimics Adobe Acrobat Distiller to behave as a virtual printer. Documents printed to FlashPaper can be printed as Adobe Flash or Adobe Portable Document Format (PDF) files.

Adobe announced it was discontinuing development of FlashPaper on September 4, 2008. The company states that "the demand [for FlashPaper] has continually declined to where it is no longer economically viable for Adobe to continue development support for FlashPaper" but noted that it would continue selling and supporting the existing version of FlashPaper. It was last included in Macromedia Studio 8, and was available for a time as a standalone product from Adobe. FlashPaper files can be also generated by ColdFusion web applications.

References

External links
 Adobe FlashPaper
 Flashpaper Support Center

Macromedia software
Discontinued Adobe software